Pogo Structures is a French boat builder founded in Quimper by Christian Bouroullec in 1987. The company moved in 1990 to Combrit, specializes in the design and manufacture of racing and cruising sailboats. It launched its first motor boat in 2017.

As of 2020, the 80 people shipyard has produced 900 boats, with an average of 55 per year over the last few years.

Construction
Pogo Structures uses, since 2004, the vacuum infusion process to build lightweight and stiff fiberglass sandwich boats. Starting 2007, the cruising range benefits from a lifting keel option.

Cruising sailboats

Racing sailboats

Motor boats

See also
 List of sailboat designers and manufacturers

References

French boat builders
Manufacturing companies established in 1987
French brands
French companies established in 1987
Sailboat manufacturers